Tyce may refer to:

 Roman Týce (born 1977), Czech former footballer
 Brendyn Tyce Carlson (born 1970), American former IndyCar Series driver
 Keith Tyce Diorio (born 1970), American dancer and choreographer

See also
 Tice (disambiguation)

Lists of people by nickname